McDonaldsville is an unincorporated community in Stark County, in the U.S. state of Ohio.

History
McDonaldsville was platted in 1829, and supposedly was named for a general in the Revolutionary War named McDonald whom the founder admired. Lack of railroad facilities inhibited the town's early growth. A post office called McDonaldsville was established in 1852, and remained in operation until 1906.

References

Unincorporated communities in Stark County, Ohio
Unincorporated communities in Ohio